Kannamma may refer to:
 Kannamma (film), a 2005 Indian Tamil film
 Kannamma (TV series), a 2015—2016 Indian Tamil television soap opera
 Kannamma (2018 TV series), a 2018 Indian Tamil television series broadcast by Raj TV

See also
 
 Kannammapet, an area in the city of Chennai, India